Ammar Souayah (born 11 June 1957) is a Tunisian football manager and former player.

Playing career
Souayah played in the econd and third divisions of Tunisia.

Managerial career

Tunisia national team
In 2002, Ammar Souayah signed as the coach of the Tunisia national team and led the team at the FIFA World Cup. Tunisia began the tournament with a 2–0 defeat against Russia then drew 1–1 against strong Belgium but was defeated 2–0 against co-host Japan and eliminated in the Group Stage.
He coached Club Sportif de Hammam-Lif and also Étoile du Sahel.

Al-Shabab Riyadh
On 23 January 2014, he was appointed the head coach of Al-Shabab, replacing Belgian Emilio Ferrera. He performed well with Al-Shabab in the 2014 AFC Champions League group stages. Al-Shabab played 6 matches, 5 won and lost 1.

Managerial statistics

Honours

Manager
Al-Shabab
King Cup of Champions: 2014

References

1957 births
Living people
Tunisian footballers
Footballers from Tunis
Tunisian football managers
2002 FIFA World Cup managers
Saudi Professional League managers
CS Hammam-Lif managers
Étoile Sportive du Sahel managers
Al-Ta'ee managers
Al-Hazm FC managers
Al-Raed FC managers
Al Shabab FC (Riyadh) managers
Ohod Club managers
Tunisian expatriate football managers
Tunisian expatriate sportspeople in Saudi Arabia
Expatriate football managers in Saudi Arabia
Association footballers not categorized by position